Denis Rodger Smith (July 26, 1896 – January 31, 1935) was a Canadian professional ice hockey defenceman who played six seasons in the National Hockey League for the Pittsburgh Pirates and Philadelphia Quakers between 1925 and 1931. He was born in Ottawa, Ontario.

Career statistics

Regular season and playoffs

External links

1896 births
1935 deaths
Canadian ice hockey defencemen
Ice hockey people from Ottawa
Ontario Hockey Association Senior A League (1890–1979) players
Pittsburgh Pirates (NHL) players
Philadelphia Quakers (NHL) players
Pittsburgh Yellow Jackets (IHL) players
Pittsburgh Yellow Jackets (USAHA) players